Nikitino is a rural locality (a village) in Semyonkovskoye Rural Settlement, Vologodsky District, Vologda Oblast, Russia. The population was 50 as of 2002.

Geography 
The distance to Vologda is 9 km, to Semyonkovo is 1 km. Semyonkovo is the nearest rural locality.

References 

Rural localities in Vologodsky District